Boogeymen: The Killer Compilation is a horror compilation video released in 2001 by FlixMix. Marketed as "The Killer Compilation," the film consists of seventeen scenes from notable, revolutionary horror titles, along with short screens describing the apropos villain.

Cast
 Note: all footage is archive footage

Bonus features
Along with the Flix Facts feature (see below) and the Easter Egg, which included the hidden Jack Frost 2 clip, there were other bonus features. These were:

Legends of the Boogeymen- biographies and histories for Pinhead, Freddy Krueger, Leatherface, Chucky, Candyman, Simon Cartwright, Wishmaster, The Tall Man, Jason Voorhees, Michael Myers, and Norman Bates
Audio commentary by Robert Englund
Name That Frame- trivia game featuring over 100 movie stills from Hellraiser, Child's Play 2, Candyman, Leprechaun, Halloween, Puppet Master, Phantasm, The Ugly, Wishmaster, The Guardian.
Theatrical trailers for Hellraiser, The Texas Chainsaw Massacre, Child's Play 2, Candyman, Leprechaun, The Ugly, Wishmaster, The Guardian, The Dentist, Phantasm, Puppet Master, and Halloween.
DVD-ROM Feature: Brain Crusher Trivia Game
DVD-ROM Feature: Downloadable sound effects

Critical reception 

AllMovie gave the documentary a negative review, writing, "Boogeymen [...] [reduces] a mystifyingly broad range of films into the lowest common denominator of trading cards and role playing."

Sequel
In 2002, FlixMix released a DVD entitled, Ultimate Fights. It featured the most intense fights ever to appear in the movies. There was supposed to be another FlixMix title that was never released, which was called Crack Me Up. It was planned to feature the funniest clips from the most recent blockbusters.

References

External links

2001 films
American documentary films
Compilation films
Documentary films about horror
Lists of horror films
2000s English-language films
2000s American films